Lieutenant-General Sir Henry James FRS MRIA (1803–1877) was a Royal Engineers officer who served as the director-general of the Ordnance Survey, the British Government mapping agency, from 1854 to 1875. Sir Henry was described by the agency itself as "perhaps Ordnance Survey's most eccentric and egotistical Director General". Sir Henry spent most of his life working for the Ordnance Survey and after becoming its head he introduced the new science of photography. He also would later claim to be the inventor of the process known as Photozincography or Zinco. Sir Henry also played a part in the resolving of the battle of the scales.

Career and early life
Born in 1803 at Rose Vale near St Agnes, Cornwall, he was the fifth son of John James of Truro and Jane, daughter of John Hoskers. He attended a grammar school in Exeter, going on to study at the Royal Military Academy, Woolwich; Upon leaving he was commissioned as a second lieutenant in the Royal Engineers on 22 September 1826. He was promoted to captain in 1846 and then to Colonel in 1857.

In 1827 he joined the Ordnance Survey and spent the majority of his career working for it, mainly in Ireland, though after a brief stint at the Admiralty, he eventually climbed through the ranks to take charge of the Edinburgh Office of the Ordnance Survey in 1850. His appointment to become head of the Ordnance Survey was controversial as his father-in-law Major-General Edward Watson RE aided him above two more obvious candidates.

He married Anne, the daughter of Major General Watson, Royal Engineers.

Director-General

In 1854, at the age of 51, he became Superintendent of the Ordnance Survey, taking over from Lieutenant Colonel Lewis Hall. He was far more experienced than his predecessor having worked most of his life for the Survey. Upon assuming the directorship, Sir Henry became involved in the battle of the scales. While the Ordnance Survey had surveyed a large part of the country, the scale at which the maps should be made and what was the most useful had yet to be decided. Sir Henry was a firm believer in the 1.2500 scale, and he used his position to effect this change despite the less than full approval of his superiors.

James created a photography department to the Ordnance Survey in 1855 as a means of reducing the scale of maps. He claimed to have invented photozincography, a photographic method of producing printing plates. In fact, the process had been developed by two of his staff. However James was the driving force behind using the process to create and publish a facsimile of the Domesday Book in the 1860s. Sir Henry has been called, by T. Owen, one of the greatest image builders the Ordnance Survey ever had, because Sir Henry made all the advances he and his department made freely available. This was taken up by many foreign governments who were suitably impressed, the Queen of Spain making him a member of the Order of Isabella the Catholic in 1863; which he added to his knighthood of 1860 for services to science.

Sir Henry James continued using his photozincographic process to preserve historic manuscripts. He went on to publish a whole series of English historical documents, the process of which continued on after his death. Similarly he ordered the Ordnance Survey of Jerusalem which was commissioned to help improve the water supply to the city. A copy of this map still survives at the National Archives.

Retirement
Due to failing health Sir Henry retired in 1875 at the age of 72, having been Director General of the Ordnance Survey for 21 years. His retirement was welcomed by his colleagues and soon after his departure a thinly veiled attack on his running of the survey was released in the Hampshire Independent in 1875. Sir Henry James died on 14 June 1877, at the age of 75, at his home in Southampton. Despite his death his mark remained on the Ordnance Survey, with a plaque with his name and the date being attached to every building at the Ordnance Survey offices that was built during his tenure.

References

Sources
"James, Sir Henry (1803-1877) surveyor", Oxford Dictionary of National Biography 
H. James, Photo-zincography, 2nd edition (with plate), (Southampton: Forbes and Bennett, 1860)
T. Owen & E. Pillbeam, Ordnance Survey: Map Makers to Britain 1791, (Southampton: Ordnance Survey; London: H.M.S.O., 1992)
G. Wakeman, Aspects of Victorian Lithography: anastatic printing and photozincography, (Wymondham: Brewhouse Press, 1970)

1803 births
1877 deaths
Military personnel from Cornwall
People from Truro
English cartographers
British Army lieutenant generals
Royal Engineers officers
Fellows of the Royal Society
Ordnance Survey
19th-century British Army personnel